The Union Trust National Bank, also known as the Union Trust and Deposit Company, is a historic bank building located at Parkersburg, Wood County, West Virginia.  It was built in 1903–1904, and is a seven-story, five bay by seven bay, "U"-shaped, masonry building in the Classical style. The central bay features a projecting three-sided bay window.  The building was ordered by Senator Johnson N. Camden (1828-1908).

It was listed on the National Register of Historic Places in 1982.

References

Bank buildings on the National Register of Historic Places in West Virginia
Commercial buildings completed in 1904
Neoclassical architecture in West Virginia
Buildings and structures in Parkersburg, West Virginia
National Register of Historic Places in Wood County, West Virginia